Vanessa myrinna, the vivid painted lady or banded lady, is a butterfly of the family Nymphalidae found in Peru, Ecuador, Brazil and Colombia.

References

Butterflies described in 1849
myrinna